Naftoli (Naphtalie) Carlebach (1916–2005) was an Orthodox Jewish rabbi and accountant.

Early life 
Carlebach was born in Leipzig, Germany to Rabbi Moshe Carlebach, a son of Rabbi Shlomo Carlebach, the av beit din (head of the rabbinical court) of Lübeck, Germany. His maternal grandfather was Rabbi Yosef Cohen, the av beit din of Eschwege, Germany.

In 1933, at age 16, his parents sent him to study Torah at the Telz Yeshiva in Lithuania, where he forged a relationship with Rabbi Eliyahu Meir Bloch, brother of Rabbi Avraham Yitzchak Bloch. Subsequently, he transferred to the Mir Yeshiva, where he developed a special connection to Rabbi Yeruchom Levovitz, the mashgiach there, prior to the latter's death.

In 1938, Carlebach was ordained as a rabbi by the heads of the Telz and Mir yeshivas. He also received rabbinical ordination from Rabbi Simcha Zelig, the posek of Brest, Belarus.

Move to America 
In the year preceding World War II, Carlebach narrowly escaped the horrors of the Holocaust through the aid of Rabbi Naftoli Neuberger, the principal of Yeshivas Ner Yisroel in Baltimore, who sent him an entry visa. There Carlebach wed his wife, Gittel Gutman, who had also come from Germany. Following his wedding, Rabbi Yaakov Yitzchok Ruderman, rosh yeshiva of Ner Yisroel, encouraged Rabbi Carlebach to accept the rabbinate at Chambersburg, Pennsylvania.

Two years later, they moved to Detroit, where he worked in Jewish education, teaching at the Yeshiva Beth Yehudah and in the rabbinate. He was instrumental in bringing out key rabbinic personnel to Detroit, such as Rabbi Leib Bakst. He once had the privilege of hosting Rabbi Eliezer Yehuda Finkel, rosh yeshiva of Mir in Poland and Jerusalem. Here, Carlebach studied with his childhood friend Rabbi Leib Bakst, rosh yeshiva of Yeshivas Detroit. Other study partners included the late Rabbi Simcha Wasserman, the son of Rabbi Elchonon Wasserman. Finally, Rabbi Carlebach forfeited his positions in Detroit in deference to his older uncle and instead worked as an accountant in Boro Park, Brooklyn, establishing the "Mir Minyan" there (located in Yeshivas Be'er Shmuel on 12th Ave.).

He made aliyah to Israel in 1979 and spent time learning Torah in the yeshivas of Mir, Kamenitz and near his home until his death. Rabbi Aryeh Finkel, the rosh yeshiva of the Mir Yeshiva in Brachfeld, Rabbi Yitzchok Ezrachi, a son-in-law of Rabbi Chaim Leib Shmuelevitz, and others eulogized.

Carlebach was survived by his wife; his sons Rabbi Moshe Carlebach of Jerusalem (father of the author of the critically acclaimed "Chavatzeles HaSharon"), Rabbi Doniel Yeruchom of Brooklyn, Rabbi Binyomin Carlebach of Jerusalem (a rosh yeshiva of Mir there and son-in-law of Rabbi Binyomin Beinush Finkel), and Rabbi Shlomo Ze'ev Carlebach; his daughter, the wife of Rabbi Gedaliah Finkel of Jerusalem; grandsons and great-grandsons. One grandson, Rabbi Eliezer Yehuda Carlebach, authored a critical analysis of the Vilna Gaon's mathematical work.

References 

German Orthodox rabbis
American Orthodox rabbis
Jewish emigrants from Nazi Germany to the United States
Naftoli
Clergy from Leipzig
1916 births
2005 deaths
20th-century American rabbis
21st-century American Jews